Christoph Biedermann (born 30 January 1987) is a former international footballer from Liechtenstein who played as a midfielder. Biedermann last played club football for FC Balzers.

External links

1987 births
Living people
Liechtenstein footballers
Liechtenstein international footballers
Association football midfielders